Nordkirchen is a municipality in the district of Coesfeld, in North Rhine-Westphalia, Germany. Nordkirchen's most famous site is Schloss Nordkirchen, built in the 18th century for a local bishop and known as the Versailles of Westphalia, as it is the largest residence in that part of Germany. Nordkirchen is known as location of a transmission site for medium wave for transmitting the program of Deutschlandfunk, the Nordkirchen transmitter.

Mayor
The mayor is Dietmar Bergmann. He was elected in 2009 and reelected in 2014 and 2020.

See also
 Arenberg-Nordkirchen

References

Coesfeld (district)